Mayvelis A. Martínez Aldúm (born June 12, 1977) is a Cuban volleyball player who competed in the 2004 Summer Olympics.

She was a member of the Cuba women's national volleyball team. She participated at the 2001 FIVB World Grand Prix, 2002 FIVB World Grand Prix, and won the bronze medal in the 2004 Olympic tournament.

References

External links 
 

1977 births
Living people
Cuban women's volleyball players
Volleyball players at the 2004 Summer Olympics
Olympic volleyball players of Cuba
Olympic bronze medalists for Cuba
Olympic medalists in volleyball
Volleyball players at the 2003 Pan American Games
Pan American Games silver medalists for Cuba
Place of birth missing (living people)
Medalists at the 2004 Summer Olympics
Pan American Games medalists in volleyball
Medalists at the 2003 Pan American Games